Bazanov (masculine) or Bazanova (feminine) is a Russian surname. Notable people with the surname include:

Aleksei Bazanov (born 1986), Russian footballer
Pyotr Bazanov (1923–2003), flying ace

See also
Bazhanov

Russian-language surnames